Pierre Veiga Sodre (born May 31, 1987) is a Brazilian football midfielder, currently playing for Moto Club de São Luís.

External links
 CBF
 internacional.com.br
 

1987 births
Sportspeople from Rio Grande do Sul
Brazilian footballers
Living people
Pierre Veiga Sodre
Association football midfielders